This is a list of châteaux in the French region of Picardy.

Aisne 
Château d'Autremencourt in Autremencourt
Château de Blérancourt in Blérancourt
Château de Caulaincourt in Caulaincourt
Château de Chailvet in Royaucourt-et-Chailvet
Château de Château-Thierry in Château-Thierry 
Château de Condé in Condé-en-Brie, classed as Monument historique, open to visitors 
Château de Coucy in Coucy-le-Château-Auffrique
Château de Fère in Fère-en-Tardenois
Château de La Ferté-Milon in La Ferté-Milon
Château François Ier in Villers-Cotterêts
Château de Guise in Guise (castle)
Château de Jouaignes in Jouaignes
Château de Marchais in Marchais
Château de Mazancourt in Vivières
Château de Montgobert in Montgobert
Château de Noüe in Villers-Cotterêts
Château du Nouvion-en-Thiérache, in Le Nouvion-en-Thiérache
Château d'Oigny-en-Valois in Oigny-en-Valois
Château de Quierzy in Quierzy
Château de Septmonts in Septmonts 
Château de Vadancourt in Maissemy
Donjon de Vic-sur-Aisne in Vic-sur-Aisne
Château de Villiers-Saint-Denis, Villiers-Saint-Denis

Oise 
Château d'Alincourt in Parnes (bought in January 2009 by Alain Duménil)
Château de Bains in Boulogne-la-Grasse
Château de Boulogne-la-Grasse in Boulogne-la-Grasse
Château de Bresles in Bresles
Château de Chantilly in Chantilly
Château de Compiègne in Compiègne
Château d'Ermenonville in Ermenonville. Jean-Jacques Rousseau died there in 1778, while going for a walk.
Château du Fayel in Fayel
Château de Lamorlaye in Lamorlaye
Château de Longueil-Sainte-Marie in Longueil-Sainte-Marie
Château Mennechet in Chiry-Ourscamp
Donjon de Clermont-en-Beauvaisis in Clermont-de-l'Oise
Château de Mello in Mello
Château du Meux at Meux
Château de Monceaux in Monceaux
Château de Montataire in Montataire
Château Mont-Royal in La Chapelle-en-Serval
Château de Montvillargenne in Gouvieux
Château de Nointel in Nointel 
Château d'Ognon in Ognon
Palais épiscopal in Beauvais
Château de Pierrefonds in Pierrefonds
Château de Senlis in Senlis
Château de Trie in Trie-Château
Château de Troissereux in Troissereux 
Château de Vallière in Mortefontaine
Château de Verneuil-en-Halatte in Verneuil-en-Halatte
Château de Versigny in Versigny
Donjon de Vez in Vez

Somme 
Château d'Aveluy in Aveluy
Château de Bagatelle, à Abbeville, classed as Monument historique, visitable
Château de Bailleul in Bailleul
Château de Beaucourt-en-Santerre in Beaucourt-en-Santerre 
Château de Bertangles in Bertangles
Château de Boves in Boves
Château de Cayeux-en-Santerre in Cayeux-en-Santerre 
Château de Chaulnes in Chaulnes (ruin)
Château de Davenescourt in Davenescourt
Château d'Eaucourt-sur-Somme in Eaucourt-sur-Somme
Château de Flixecourt classed as Monument historique, visitable
Château de Folleville (Somme) in Folleville 
Château de Grivesnes, à Grivesnes (ruin)
Château fort de Ham in Ham, classed as Monument historique, visitable 
Château d'Heilly in Heilly
Château de Long in Long (Somme), classed as Monument historique
Château de Mailly-Raineval in Mailly-Raineval 
Château de Moreuil in Moreuil 
Château de Péronne (Somme) in Péronne 
Château de Picquigny in Picquigny, classed as Monument historique, visitable 
Château du Plouy in Vismes(built in the Renaissance)
Château de Pont-Remy in Pont-Remy (built in the Renaissance)
Château de Rambures in Rambures, classed as Monument historique, visitable
Château de Tilloloy in Tilloloy
Château de Vismes in Vismes
Château de Warvillers in Warvillers

Notes and references

See also
 List of castles in France

 Picardy